In enzymology, a N-acetylglucosaminyl-proteoglycan 4-beta-glucuronosyltransferase is an enzyme that catalyzes the chemical reaction

UDP-alpha-D-glucuronate + N-acetyl-alpha-D-glucosaminyl-(1->4)-beta-D-glucuronosyl- proteoglycan  UDP + beta-D-glucuronosyl-(1->4)-N-acetyl-alpha-D-glucosaminyl-(1->4)- beta-D-glucuronosyl-proteoglycan

The 3 substrates of this enzyme are UDP-alpha-D-glucuronate, [[N-acetyl-alpha-D-glucosaminyl-(1->4)-beta-D-glucuronosyl-]], and proteoglycan, whereas its 3 products are UDP, [[beta-D-glucuronosyl-(1->4)-N-acetyl-alpha-D-glucosaminyl-(1->4)-]], and beta-D-glucuronosyl-proteoglycan.

This enzyme belongs to the family of glycosyltransferases, specifically the hexosyltransferases.  The systematic name of this enzyme class is UDP-alpha-D-glucuronate:N-acetyl-alpha-D-glucosaminyl-(1->4)-beta-D- glucuronosyl-proteoglycan 4-beta-glucuronosyltransferase. Other names in common use include N-acetylglucosaminylproteoglycan beta-1,4-glucuronyltransferase, and heparan glucuronyltransferase II.  This enzyme participates in heparan sulfate biosynthesis and glycan structures - biosynthesis 1.

References

 
 

EC 2.4.1
Enzymes of unknown structure